Mihailo Ivanović may refer to:
 Mihailo Ivanović (politician)
 Mihailo Ivanović (football manager)
 Mihailo Ivanović (footballer, born 2004)